Wanda Brister (born August 12, 1957) is an American operatic mezzo-soprano and voice teacher.

Biography
Born in Houma, Louisiana, she has appeared throughout the Americas, Europe, and South America. She matriculated at Loyola University of the South, studying with Patricia Brooks Etienne (Havranek). It was here she made her unofficial debut in 1978 as Maddalena in act 4 of Rigoletto, opposite Anthony Laciura as the Duke of Mantua. Two years later, she sang the Zia Principessa in Suor Angelica at Loyola. She holds degrees from the University of Southern Mississippi and the University of Louisiana, Lafayette where she worked with Patrick Shelby, a student of Andrew White and Sidney Dietch.

She served as an apprentice at the New Orleans Opera Association (where she made her professional debut in 1981 as Mistress Benson in Lakmé) before attending the Academy of Vocal Arts, Philadelphia, where she then was an apprentice with the Opera Company of Philadelphia. After several years of work as a professional singer and beginning her life as a university professor, she pursued and completed a Doctor of Musical Arts degree at University of Nevada, Las Vegas, where she studied with renowned vocal repertoire scholar Carol Kimball. Her dissertation topic was "The Songs of Madeleine Dring: Organizing a Posthumous Legacy."

Brister studied under Nell Rankin from 1984-1990, a 24-year veteran of the Metropolitan Opera who had studied with Madame Jeanne Lorraine, a student of Manuel Garcia II. Brister also worked with Beverly Wolff, who spent many years at New York City Opera, San Francisco Opera, Dallas, and all of the major symphony orchestras in the United States. Among others, Beverly had been a student of Sidney Dietch and Lila Edwards. Brister coached with Enrico Di Giuseppe, a tenor from the Metropolitan Opera in the early 1990s. She appeared with the Opera Orchestra of New York, Opera Company of Philadelphia, Baltimore Opera, Opera Theatre of Saint Louis, New York Opera Ensemble, Annapolis Opera, Pittsburgh Opera Theater, Connecticut Grand Opera, New England Lyric Operetta, Jefferson Performing Arts Society, Lyric Opera of Waco, Shreveport Opera, etc., and orchestras in New York, Pennsylvania, Connecticut, Louisiana, Florida, Arizona, West Virginia, and New Hampshire. She has sung over 200 recitals in 43 states and brought this literature to festivals in Brazil, Bulgaria, Canada, England, Germany, Hungary, Italy, Lithuania, Poland, Russia, and Ukraine.

She has made several recordings including: Strauss Waltzes for Singing, (Arabesque with New York Vocal Arts Ensemble), Clarikinetics; Landscapes I: The Music of Daniel Baldwin; Landscapes II; Vocalise: Music for Voice, Bassoon, and Piano; (all on Mark Records). Her solo discs include: The Songs of Madeleine Dring with tenor Stanford Olsen, and Le premier matin du monde, In 2015 she recorded 17 pieces entitled "Cabaret Songs of Madeleine Dring" with Courtney Kenny (2018), and another 30 pieces in 2016 "Madeleine Dring: Lady Composer" (2022). All of these discs are available from Cambria Music.

She has appeared as soloist at Carnegie Hall on seven occasions, and has sung under the batons of Krzysztof Penderecki, Michael Tilson Thomas, John Rutter, John Nelson (conductor), Philippe Entremont, Arthur Fagen, Chris Nance, Leopold Hager, Gianfranco Masini, and Eve Queler. She has performed over 200 times with orchestra, including over 100 operatic performances. She has participated in choral ensembles with Michael Korn, Erich Leinsdorf, and Lorin Maazel.

From 1986 to 1988, she was a member of the quartet New York Vocal Arts Ensemble and continued to work with that ensemble on occasion through 1996. Together with this group she traveled throughout the United States, and appeared in concerts for the Government's Concert Agency (GOSConcert) in the former Soviet Union and in other "Eastern Bloc" countries from 1988-1992. She has sung throughout the North Atlantic with this quartet with Cunard Cruise lines as well as a solo tour of the American west coast with Epirotiki.

She has taught at Baylor University (1999-2000), the University of Arizona (2000-2003), and the Florida State University (2003–present). She has appeared at festivals including Steinfurt (Germany) Festival, Schwetzingen (Germany) Festival, Varna (Bulgaria) Fest, the IV International Festival of Winds in Rio de Janeiro, Brazil, as well as in concerts for the International Double Reed Society in Ithaca, New York, Birmingham, England, and Norman, Oklahoma. 

Brister sang Mistress Benson (Lakmé) again in 2006 with the Opera Orchestra of New York, 25 years after her professional debut in the same part. She continued to appear in recitals and concerts until it became difficult to sing as the result of a lung disease sarcoidosis. Her students sing at companies throughout the United States and Europe and many have faculty positions in American universities. 

She was a teaching intern with the National Association of Teachers of Singing under the acclaimed vocal pedagogue, James McKinney, and has published articles with the Journal of Singing. (See Josef Szulc, Jean Cras, Madeleine Dring. She has also published about auditioning for college programs and submitted articles to the International Alliance for Women in Music, for which she is a Member of the Board of Directors, and has been published in the Light Music Society Journal of Great Britain. She won an award from that society for her 2018 release of Madeleine Dring Cabaret Songs. She has also received positive reviews for her recordings in the Journal of Singing and the International Double Reed Society Journal, as well as the Journal of the Light Music Society. Her recent book received positive reviews from Graham Johnson, Joseph Horovitz, the Double Reed Society Journal, the British Double Reed Society, the NATS Journal of Singing, and journals of the Kapralova Society, the Light Music Society, and the International Alliance for Women in Music. 

She was faculty artist for the Orfeo Music Festival in Vipiteno, Italy from 2010-2015, and was artist faculty of the Schlern International Music Festival (2006-2009). In 2013 she presented on Madeleine Dring to the International Congress of Voice Teachers in Brisbane, Australia. She has also presented for the National Association of Teachers of Singing national conference in Las Vegas and the Music by Women Festival in 2018, 2019, 2020, and 2022 as well as the Women Composers Festival of Hartford of 2019.  Brister compiled and edited a series of 10 scores published by Classical Vocal Reprints. Madeleine Dring's only opera Cupboard Love as well as 9 volumes of the previously unavailable vocal music were published are in this series. She has written a Madeleine Dring biography with her former colleague, Jay Rosenblatt (Clemson University Press, 2020) entitled Madeleine Dring: Lady Composer.

Discography
1988: Strauss Waltzes for Singing New York Vocal Arts Ensemble, Arabesque Records, New York.
2006: Le premier matin du monde Songs of Fauré, Debussy, Poulenc, Satie, and Ernest Chausson. Cambria Records.
2006: Clarikinetics with Debora Bish, Clarinet, Mark Records.
2010: Landscapes: Music by Daniel Baldwin, Mark Records.
2013: Songs of Madeleine Dring, with Tenor Stanford Olsen, Cambria Music.
20__: Landscapes II: Music of Daniel Baldwin, Mark Records. (in press)
2013: Trio Vocalise: Music by Laitman, Baldwin, McLarry, Chabrier.
2018: Cabaret Songs of Madeleine Dring: Cambria Music.
2022: Madeleine Dring: The Lady Composer: Cambria Music.

References 

American operatic mezzo-sopranos
Voice teachers
Living people
1957 births
People from Houma, Louisiana
21st-century American women